The Flag Officer Plymouth  was a senior Royal Navy appointment first established in July 1969. The office holder was responsible for the administration of the faciliites of the two major Royal Navy at Plymouth and Portsmouth. The appointment continued until 1996 when it was abolished.

From July 1970 all new appointees holding this title jointly held the title of Port Admiral, Devonport.

History
The appointment was established in July 1969 when the two major home commanders-in-chief, Commander-in-Chief, Plymouth and Commander-in-Chief, Portsmouth were amalgamated into the new centralised Naval Home Command. As a result of these organisational changes Flag Officer Plymouth became one of the new area commanders subordinate to the Commander-in-Chief, Naval Home Command. 

On 30 December 1970, Vice-Admiral J R McKaig CBE was appointed as Port Admiral, Devonport of  HM Naval Base, Devonport, and Flag Officer, Plymouth. On 5 September 1971, all Royal Navy Flag Officers holding positions of Admiral Superintendents at Royal Naval Dockyard's were restyled as Port Admirals.

Office Holders
Included:
Jul 1969 – Sept 1969 Vice-Admiral John Roxburgh 
1969 – 1970 Vice-Admiral Sir Anthony Griffin
1970 – 1973 Vice-Admiral Sir Rae McKaig
1973 – 1975 Vice-Admiral Sir Arthur Power
1975 – 1977 Vice-Admiral Sir Gordon Tait
1977 – 1979 Vice-Admiral Sir John Forbes
1979 – 1981 Vice-Admiral Sir Peter Berger
1981 – 1982 Vice-Admiral Sir Simon Cassels
1982 – 1985 Vice-Admiral Sir David Brown
1985 – 1987 Vice-Admiral Sir Robert Gerken
1987 – 1990 Vice-Admiral Sir John Webster
1990 – 1992 Vice-Admiral Sir Alan Grose
1992 – 1996 Vice-Admiral Sir Roy Newman.

Footnotes

Royal Navy appointments